Antler Peak may refer to:

 Antler Peak Formation, a geologic formation in Nevada, USA.
 Antler Peak (Washington), a peak in Mount Rainier National Park in Washington, USA.
 Antler Peak (Wyoming), a peak in the Gallatin Range in Yellowstone National Park in Wyoming, USA.